The Central African Republic competed at the 2012 Summer Paralympics in London, United Kingdom from August 29 to September 9, 2012.

Athletics 

Men's Field Events

See also

 Central African Republic at the 2012 Summer Olympics

References

Nations at the 2012 Summer Paralympics
2012